Saline County State Fish and Wildlife Area is an Illinois state park on  in Saline County, Illinois, United States.

References

State parks of Illinois
Protected areas of Saline County, Illinois
Protected areas established in 1959
1959 establishments in Illinois